The 2008 Paris Municipal elections were held on 9 and 16 March 2008, at the same time as other French municipal elections. The incumbent Mayor of Paris, Bertrand Delanoë (PS), faced UMP candidate Françoise de Panafieu who was chosen to head his party's list in a primary election held in 2006. The MoDem MEP and François Bayrou supporter, Marielle de Sarnez, was the centrist candidate.

Control of the 20 arrondissements of the French capital was also to be decided in the elections. Of these, the PS-Greens-MRC controlled 12 (10 PS, 1 Green, 1 MRC) and the UMP eight. 163 councillors were due to be elected in the 20 arrondissements. As a result of the election, Bertrand Delanoë was re-elected with a larger majority. The left controls 99 seats against 63 for the right, two for other right-wing dissidents, and one MoDem.

Results

1st Arrondissement

2nd Arrondissement

3rd Arrondissement

4th Arrondissement

5th Arrondissement

6th Arrondissement

7th Arrondissement

8th arrondissement

9th Arrondissement

10th Arrondissement

11th Arrondissement

12th Arrondissement

13th Arrondissement

14th Arrondissement

15th Arrondissement

16th Arrondissement

17th Arrondissement

18th Arrondissement

19th Arrondissement

20th Arrondissement

See also

2008 French municipal elections
2008 Marseille municipal election

Sources and notes 

Paris municipal election
Municipal elections in France
Municipal election
Elections in Paris
Paris municipal election